Electronic Defense Laboratories, located in Mountain View, California, known in the 1960s and 1970s simply as "EDL", was a semi-private corporate entity, essentially funded by the Department of Defense, that drew heavily on civilian scientific expertise. It was created in 1954 as an extension of the new Electronic System Division (in Buffalo, New York) of Sylvania Electric Products and directed by future defense secretary William Perry.

It was instrumental in development of post-Distant Early Warning line defense technologies, particularly in the area of microwave devices, and pioneered strategic communications capabilities such as the ECHO Balloon project, the forerunner of modern satellite telecommunications systems.

Other projects included development of reconnaissance and countermeasures receivers for various covert and military applications.

Much of its defense work was highly classified and remained strictly 'off-limits' to the public sector.

References 

United States defense procurement
Defense companies of the United States